Daniel Dubois (born 5 February 1952) is a French politician and a member of the Senate of France. He represents the Somme department and is a member of the Union for French Democracy Party.

References
Page on the Senate website

1952 births
Living people
French Senators of the Fifth Republic
Union of Democrats and Independents politicians
Union for French Democracy politicians
Senators of Somme (department)